Now That's What I Call the 80s is a special edition compilation album from the Now! series in the United States, containing hit songs from the 1980s. It was released on March 11, 2008. In addition to a traditional CD release, an 80-track "deluxe digital edition" was made available for download only on iTunes.

The album debuted at number 11 on the Billboard 200 album chart, selling just under 34,000 copies in its first week. Sales of the deluxe edition are counted separately.

"Let's Get It Started - Black Eyed Peas
"Fun In the Sun - Steve Harwell
"Na Na - Superchick
"Let's Bounce - Christy Carlson Romano
"Jump - Simple Plan
"Getcha Getcha feat. St. Lunatics - Nelly
"Holla! - Baha Men
"SpongeBob SquarePants Theme - Avril Lavigne
"Throw Your Hands Up - Jump5
"Turn the Beat Around - Gloria Estefan
"Rhythm Divine - Enrique Iglesias
"Ritmo Total - Enrique Iglesias
"Y-Tu-Conga - Gloria Estefan
"Rocket Man - Me First and the Gimme Gimmes
"I Just Wanna Live - Good Charlotte
"Boom - Fan 3
"First Day of the Rest of Our Lives - MxPx
"Goofy Goober Rock - Tom Rothrock with Jim Wise
"Start Jumpin' (Double Dutch Remix) - Jump5
"Freeze Frame - Jump5
"Danny Phantom Theme - Danny Phantom
"Teenage Superstar (Hard in Tango Remix) - Kim-Lian
"Word Up! - Korn
"Lean Back feat. Fat Joe & Remy Ma - Terror Squad
"Car Wash (song) (Shark Tale Mix) feat. Missy Elliott - Christina Aguilera
"Hey Driver - Lucky Boys Confusion
"All Grown Up With You! - All Grown Up!
"Over the Rainbow - Me First and the Gimme Gimmes

Track listing (deluxe digital edition)
Michael Jackson – "Billie Jean" (1983)
M – "Pop Muzik" (1980)
Rupert Holmes – "Escape (The Pina Colada Song)" (1980)
The Buggles – "Video Killed the Radio Star" (1980)
Blondie – "Call Me" (1980)
The Romantics – "What I Like About You" (1980)
Pat Benatar – "Hit Me with Your Best Shot" (1980)
Kool & the Gang – "Celebration" (1980)
REO Speedwagon – "Keep on Loving You" (1981)
Kim Carnes – "Bette Davis Eyes" (1981)
Rick Springfield – "Jessie's Girl" (1981)
Hall & Oates – "You Make My Dreams" (1981)
Billy Squier – "The Stroke" (1981)
Juice Newton – "Queen of Hearts" (1981)
Red Rider – "Lunatic Fringe" (1981)
The J. Geils Band – "Centerfold" (1982)
Tommy Tutone – "867-5309/Jenny" (1982)
The Go-Go's – "We Got the Beat" (1982)
The Human League – "Don't You Want Me" (1982)
The Motels – "Only the Lonely" (1982)
Steve Miller – "Abracadabra" (1982)
Survivor – "Eye of the Tiger" (1982)
Missing Persons – "Words" (1982)
A Flock of Seagulls – "I Ran (So Far Away)" (1982)
Toni Basil – "Mickey" (1982)
The Pointer Sisters – "I'm So Excited" (1982)
Stray Cats – "Rock This Town" (1982)
Marvin Gaye – "Sexual Healing" (1982)
Toto – "Africa" (1983)
Frida – "I Know There's Something Going On" (1983)
Culture Club – "Do You Really Want to Hurt Me" (1983)
Duran Duran – "Hungry Like the Wolf" (1983)
Thomas Dolby – "She Blinded Me with Science" (1983)
David Bowie – "Let's Dance" (1983)
The Tubes – "She's a Beauty" (1983)
Kajagoogoo – "Too Shy" (1983)
Bonnie Tyler – "Total Eclipse of the Heart" (1983)
Men Without Hats – "The Safety Dance" (1983)
Spandau Ballet – "True" (1983)
The Fixx – "One Thing Leads to Another" (1983)
Herbie Hancock – "Rockit" (1983)
Lionel Richie – "All Night Long (All Night)" (1983)
Billy Joel – "Uptown Girl" (1983)
Cyndi Lauper – "Girls Just Want to Have Fun" (1984)
Billy Idol – "Rebel Yell" (1984)
Kenny Loggins – "Footloose" (1984)
Berlin – "No More Words" (1984)
Night Ranger – "Sister Christian" (1984)
Dan Hartman – "I Can Dream About You" (1984)
Tina Turner – "What's Love Got to Do with It" (1984)
Corey Hart – "Sunglasses at Night" (1984)
John Waite – "Missing You" (1984)
Wham! – "Wake Me Up Before You Go-Go" (1984)
Animotion – "Obsession" (1985)
Simple Minds – "Don't You (Forget About Me)" (1985)
Tears for Fears – "Everybody Wants to Rule the World" (1985)
Katrina and the Waves – "Walking on Sunshine" (1985)
Heart – "What About Love" (1985)
Huey Lewis and the News – "The Power of Love" (1985)
Ready for the World – "Oh Sheila" (1985)
Starship – "We Built This City" (1985)
Mr. Mister – "Broken Wings" (1986)
Miami Sound Machine – "Conga" (1986)
Robert Palmer – "Addicted to Love" (1986)
Level 42 – "Something About You" (1986)
The Outfield – "Your Love" (1986)
Steve Winwood – "Higher Love" (1986)
Cameo – "Word Up!" (1986)
The Bangles – "Walk Like an Egyptian" (1987)
Wang Chung – "Everybody Have Fun Tonight" (1987)
Cutting Crew – "(I Just) Died in Your Arms" (1987)
Lisa Lisa and Cult Jam – "Head to Toe" (1987)
Whitesnake – "Here I Go Again" (1987)
Belinda Carlisle – "Heaven Is a Place on Earth" (1987)
Salt-n-Pepa – "Push It" (1987)
Breathe – "Hands to Heaven" (1987)
Bobby McFerrin – "Don't Worry, Be Happy" (1988)
Poison – "Every Rose Has Its Thorn" (1988)
Paula Abdul – "Straight Up" (1988)
Great White – "Once Bitten, Twice Shy" (1989)

See also
 Now That's What I Call the 80s 2

References

2008 compilation albums
1980s 01